Pixel binning, often called binning, is the process of combining adjacent pixels throughout an image, by summing or averaging their values, during or after readout.

Charge from adjacent pixels in CCD image sensors and some other image sensors can be combined during readout, increasing the line rate or frame rate.

In the context of image processing, binning is the procedure of combining clusters of adjacent pixels, throughout an image, into single pixels. For example, in 2x2 binning, an array of 4 pixels becomes a single larger pixel, reducing the number of pixels to 1/4 and halving the image resolution in each dimension. The result can be the sum, average, median, minimum, or maximum value of the cluster.

This aggregation, although associated with loss of information, reduces the amount of data to be processed, facilitating analysis. The binned image has lower resolution, but the relative noise level in each pixel is generally reduced.

See also
Binning (disambiguation)
Downsampling (signal processing)
Image scaling

References

Image processing